Alexander Mackenzie,  (1838 – 22 January 1898) was a Scottish historian, author, magazine editor and politician. He was born on a croft, in Gairloch. He had little opportunity for education and initially earned his living as a labourer and ploughman. In 1861 he became apprenticed in the clothes trade selling Scottish cloth in Colchester. In 1869 he settled in Inverness, where he and his brother set up a clothes shop in Clach na Cudainn House. From his business premises he derived his nickname 'Clach na Cudainn' or simply 'Clach'. He later became an editor and publisher of the Celtic Magazine, and the Scottish Highlander. Mackenzie wrote numerous clan histories. He was a fellow of the Society of Antiquaries of Scotland. A founder member of the Gaelic Society of Inverness, Mackenzie was elected an 'Honorary Chieftain' in 1894.

The Highland clearances and land reform
In the 1880s Mackenzie became actively involved in the Highland land issue and campaigned for security of tenure for crofters. In Nuair Chaidh na Ceithir Ùr Oirre, Màiri Mhòr nan Òran describes going with him, Charles Fraser-Mackintosh and others to elicit the support of Mrs. MacRae of Stromeferry for their cause and affectionately tells how "the Clach" discouraged 17-stone Màiri from getting into a rowing boat with the others. First published in 1883, MacKenzie's History of the Highland Clearances has remained in print to the present times. John Prebble wrote "...it has been and will remain a book to be read, an essential part of any study of the clearances".

Bibliography

See also
Brahan Seer

References

External links
 
 

1838 births
1898 deaths
19th-century Scottish historians
Scottish politicians
Fellows of the Society of Antiquaries of Scotland